The Centre d'Excellence Sports Rousseau is a 3,100 capacity multi-purpose arena in Boisbriand, Quebec, Canada. It is home to the Blainville-Boisbriand Armada ice hockey club in the QMJHL, who were previously known as the Montreal Junior Hockey Club.

The area has ice surface dimensions available:

 200 x 85 for hockey
 130 x 65 for 3 on 3 events
 55 x 30 for other events

References

External links
 Rink home page

Indoor arenas in Quebec
Indoor ice hockey venues in Quebec
Quebec Major Junior Hockey League arenas
Sports venues in Quebec
Boisbriand
Buildings and structures in Laurentides
2011 establishments in Quebec
Sports venues completed in 2011